Pietro Marco Strada (born 11 December 1969 in Italy) is an Italian retired footballer.

Career

Before the 1998 FIFA World Cup, Strada was called up for a friendly against Paraguay and was shortlisted for the World Cup squad but could not participate in either due to injury.

References

External links
 

Living people
Italian footballers
1969 births
Association football forwards
Association football wingers
Association football midfielders
Footballers from Brescia
Bologna F.C. 1909 players
U.S. Salernitana 1919 players
A.C. Reggiana 1919 players
A.C. Perugia Calcio players
Genoa C.F.C. players
Cosenza Calcio players
U.C. Sampdoria players
U.S. Cremonese players
Brescia Calcio players
Parma Calcio 1913 players